Liborio Romero (born July 23, 1979 in Tenancingo, Tlaxcala) is a boxer from Mexico, who represented his native country in the Men's Light Flyweight (– 48 kg) category at the 2000 Summer Olympics in Sydney, Australia.

There he was stopped in the second round by Lithuania's Ivanas Stapovičius. Romero, nicknamed Cañas, won the silver medal a year earlier in the same weight division at the Pan American Games.

External links
 sports-reference

1979 births
Living people
Boxers from Tlaxcala
Light-flyweight boxers
Boxers at the 1999 Pan American Games
Boxers at the 2000 Summer Olympics
Olympic boxers of Mexico
Mexican male boxers
Pan American Games silver medalists for Mexico
Pan American Games medalists in boxing
Central American and Caribbean Games bronze medalists for Mexico
Competitors at the 1998 Central American and Caribbean Games
Central American and Caribbean Games medalists in boxing
Medalists at the 1999 Pan American Games